Faxon is a town in Comanche County, Oklahoma, United States. It is located on Oklahoma State Highway 36 about 18.3 driving miles southwest of Lawton. The population was 136 at the 2010 census. It is included in the Lawton, Oklahoma Metropolitan Statistical Area.

Geography
Faxon is located at  (34.458327, -98.579721).

Climate

Demographics

As of the census of 2010, there were 136 people, 55 households, and 39 families residing in the town. There were 66 housing units at an average density of 258.3 per square mile (99.7/km2). The racial makeup of the town was 89.7% White, 0.7% African American, 4.4% Native American, 0.7% Asian, 0.0% from other races, and 4.4% from two or more races. Hispanic or Latino of any race were 3.7% of the population.

There were 55 households, out of which 34.5% had children under the age of 18 living with them, 50.9% were married couples living together, 14.5% had a female householder with no husband present, and 29.1% were non-families. 29.1% of all households were made up of individuals, and 18.2% had someone living alone who was 65 years of age or older. The average household size was 2.47 and the average family size was 2.82.

In the town, the population was spread out, with 28.7% under the age of 18, 2.9% from 18 to 24, 19.1% from 25 to 44, 31.6% from 45 to 64, and 17.6% who were 65 years of age or older. The median age was 44.5 years. For every 100 females, there were 83.8 males. For every 100 females age 18 and over, there were 73.2 males.

According to the 2000 census, the median income for a household in the town was $25,000, and the median income for a family was $31,250. Males had a median income of $30,833 versus $21,250 for females. The per capita income for the town was $13,630. There were 15.4% of families and 13.8% of the population living below the poverty line, including 13.2% of under eighteens and 5.9% of those over 64.

References

External links
 
 

Towns in Comanche County, Oklahoma
Towns in Oklahoma